On 24 December 1811, a storm resulted in the wrecking of six vessels on the Haak Sand north of Texel and the loss of over 600 lives.

Grasshopper, The 74-gun , the ship-sloop , the brig-sloop  and the hired armed ship   left Göteborg on 18 December 1811 as escorts to a convoy of 15 transports and a fleet of merchantmen, some 120 sail or more. Four or five days later Egeria and Prince William separated, together with the vessels going to the Humber and Scotland, including most of the merchant vessels. The transports and a handful of the merchantmen proceeded with Hero and Grasshopper.

On 24–25 December Hero and Grasshopper and the vessels they were escorting encountered a storm that result in the loss of most of them.

Naval vessels

Transport vessels and merchantmen

See also
 HMS St George § last voyage and loss in the same storm off Jutland

References

Haak Sand